The 2004 Bucknell Bison football team was an American football team that represented Bucknell University during the 2004 NCAA Division I-AA football season. Bucknell tied for third in the Patriot League. 

In their second season under head coach Tim Landis, the  Bison compiled a 7–4 record. Kevin Ransome and Daris Wilson were the team captains.

The Bison outscored opponents 296 to 221. Their 4–2 conference record tied for third place in the seven-team Patriot League standings. 

Bucknell played its home games at Christy Mathewson–Memorial Stadium on the university campus in Lewisburg, Pennsylvania.

Schedule

References

Bucknell
Bucknell Bison football seasons
Bucknell Bison football